Monowi is an incorporated village in Boyd County, Nebraska, United States. It garnered national and international recognition after the 2010 United States census counted only one resident of the village, Elsie Eiler. Though the 2020 census listed Monowi's population as two, this was confirmed to be an example of differential privacy in the census data; Eiler remains the town's sole resident.

According to tradition, the name Monowi means "flower" in an unidentified Native American language. Monowi was so named after the many wildflowers growing at the original site of the village.

History

Monowi was platted in 1903, when the Mason, Elkhorn and Missouri Valley Railroad was extended to that point. A post office was established in Monowi in 1902 and remained in operation until 1967.

Monowi's peak years were in the 1930s, when it had a population of 150. Like many other small communities in the Great Plains, it lost its younger residents to cities that were experiencing growth and offering better jobs. 

During the 2000 census, the village had a total population of two; only one married couple, Rudy and Elsie Eiler, lived there. Rudy died in 2004, leaving his wife as the only resident in the village. In this capacity, she acts as mayor, and granted herself a liquor license. She is required to produce a municipal road plan every year in order to secure state funding for the village's four street lights.

Although the village is nearly abandoned, it does have a bar called the Monowi Tavern, operated by Eiler for passing travelers and tourists. In addition, Eiler maintains the five-thousand–volume Rudy's Library, founded in memory of her late husband.

In 2018, the village was featured in commercials for Arby's and Prudential. The village was also used as a starting place for the biggest advertisement poster in the world, which was finished on June 13, 2018.

Census data
After the 1990 United States census, Eiler had observed that Monowi's population had been miscounted, and contacted radio broadcaster Paul Harvey to publicize the error. Years later, preliminary information from the 2020 census appeared to show that Monowi's population increased to two. However, Eiler denied that anyone had moved into the town, and a spokesperson for the United States Census Bureau said that the alleged second resident was actually a form of "noise... add[ed] to the [census] data," in which some individuals are listed in a bordering tract to protect the anonymity of census respondents.

Geography
The village is located in the far eastern portion of Boyd County, in the northeastern region of Nebraska. It is located between the Niobrara River and the larger Missouri River.

Demographics

Census data for Monowi highlights its uniqueness, owing to the numerical singularity of its population. As of 2020:
 The total population was two (87.5 years old, female, white, named Elsie).
 She was the two householders, living alone.
 Of the three housing units in Monowi, only hers was occupied.

Education
The area is within Boyd County Public Schools. The area was previously within the Lynch Public Schools district in Lynch. The Lynch district consolidated into the Boyd County district in June 2017.

See also
Hibberts Gore, Maine – a tiny community in the US with a population of one
PhinDeli Town Buford, Wyoming – an abandoned unincorporated community in the US that gained media attention in 2011 for housing only one person
Rochefourchat, Drôme – a commune in southeastern France with a single resident

Notes

References

External links

"Welcome to Monowi, Nebraska: population 1" by Will Francome, Megan Garner & Eliot Stein. BBC. 30 January 2018.

1902 establishments in Nebraska
Populated places established in 1902
Villages in Boyd County, Nebraska